Aila Flöjt (born 22 September 1946) is a Finnish ski orienteering competitor. At the World Ski Orienteering Championships in 1975 she won a gold medal with the Finnish relay team, together with Raili Sallinen and Sinikka Kukkonen, and placed seventh in the individual contest. At the 1977 World Championships in Velingrad, Bulgaria, she won a gold medal in the relay, with Kaija Halonen and Sinikka Kukkonen, and placed fifth in the individual contest.

See also
 Finnish orienteers
 List of orienteers
 List of orienteering events

References

Finnish orienteers
Female orienteers
Ski-orienteers
1946 births
Living people